Noce may refer to:

People
 Augusto Del Noce (1910–1989), Italian philosopher and political thinker
 Claudio Noce (born 1975), Italian film director and screenwriter
 Daniel Noce, American army officer
 Luisa Della Noce (1923–2008), Italian actress
 Mario Noce (born 1999), Italian footballer
 Paul Noce (born 1959), American baseball player
 Teresa Noce (1900–1980), Italian labour leader and activist
 Vincent Della Noce (born 1943), Canadian politician

Places
 , Italy
 Noce, Vicopisano, Italy
 Nocé, Orne, France

Other